Donald Wesley Wheeler (September 29, 1922 – December 10, 2003) was an American professional baseball player, a catcher who appeared in 67 games in Major League Baseball catcher for the Chicago White Sox in 1949.

Wheeler, nicknamed "Scotty" due to his part-Scottish ancestry, graduated from South High School and signed with his hometown club, the Minneapolis Millers of the American Association, then an independently operated minor-league team, in 1941.  After his first two professional seasons, in 1943 he joined the United States Army for World War II service; he saw combat in the European Theatre and was awarded the Bronze Star Medal.

The White Sox selected him in the  Rule 5 draft, and in  he was part of Chicago's three-man catching platoon, along with Joe Tipton and Eddie Malone. Wheeler led the trio with 54 starts behind the plate and 473 innings caught, just ahead of Tipton (49 starts, 441 innings) and Malone (48 starts, 418 innings).
Highlights included a four-hit, five-RBI day on July 30 against the eventual world champion New York Yankees, and his only big-league home run, struck June 12 off Ellis Kinder of the Boston Red Sox.

Wheeler returned to the minors in 1950 and effectively retired after the 1952 season, although he appeared in one game for the Millers at age 37 in 1960; he was serving as the club's part-time batting practice pitcher at the time.  In his lone MLB season, Wheeler collected 46 total hits, with nine doubles and two triples accompanying his home run. He was credited with 22 runs batted in.  He died at age 81 in Bloomington, Minnesota, on December 10, 2003.

References

External links

1922 births
2003 deaths
Baseball players from Minneapolis
Charleston Senators players
Chicago White Sox players
Colorado Springs Sky Sox players
Eau Claire Bears players
Major League Baseball catchers
Memphis Chickasaws players
Minneapolis Millers (baseball) players
St. Cloud Rox players
Sioux City Soos players
South High School (Minnesota) alumni
Toledo Mud Hens players